Hashian (also Romanized as Ḩashīān, Hasheyān, and Hashīān; also known as Ḩasanīān) is a village in Malmir Rural District, Sarband District, Shazand County, Markazi Province, Iran. At the 2006 census, its population was 283, in 69 families.

References 

Populated places in Shazand County